Le Beaucet is a commune in the Vaucluse department in the Provence-Alpes-Côte d'Azur region in southeastern France. The village is located southeast of Carpentras, at the western end of the Monts de Vaucluse.

See also
Communes of the Vaucluse department

References

Communes of Vaucluse